Pascale Schnider (born 18 October 1984 in Flühli) is a Swiss road and track racing cyclist. She was the Swiss National Road Race champion in 2011.

Palmares

2005
3rd in National Championship, Road, ITT, Elite
1st in European Championship, Track, Scratch, U23
3rd in European Championship, Track, Pursuit, U23
2006
2nd in National Championship, Road, ITT, Elite
2nd in European Championship, Track, Pursuit, U23
2007
3rd in National Championship, Road, ITT
2008
2nd in National Championship, Road
1st in Road World Cup 2008 Open de Suede Vargarda TTT 
2009 – Cervélo TestTeam 2009 season
2010
11th in UCI Track Cycling World Championships, Pursuit
1st in National Championship, Road, ITT
2nd in National Championship, Road
2011
7th in 2011 UCI Track Cycling World Championships, Pursuit
1st in National Championship, Track, Omnium
1st in National Championship, Road, ITT
1st in National Championship, Road
19th in 2011 UCI Road World Championships, Women's time trial

References

External links

1984 births
Living people
People from Entlebuch District
Swiss track cyclists
Swiss female cyclists
Sportspeople from the canton of Lucerne